Tom Thomas may refer to:
Tom Thomas (baseball), pitcher in Major League Baseball
Tom Thomas (rugby league), Welsh rugby league footballer
Tom Thomas (priest) (1914–1999), Anglican dean of Melbourne
Thomas Thomas (boxer), known as Tom Thomas (1880–1911), Welsh boxer
Tom Thomas, character in Fireman Sam

See also
Tommy Thomas (disambiguation)
Thomas Thomas (disambiguation)